Padmanabha Tirtha (attained Siddhi 1324) was a Dvaita philosopher, scholar and the disciple of Madhvacharya. Ascending the pontifical seat after Madhva, he served as the primary commentator of his works and in doing so, significantly elucidated Madhva's terse and laconic style of writing. His pioneering efforts in expanding upon the Dvaita texts to uncover the underlying metaphysical intricacies was taken forward by the 14th Century philosopher, Jayatirtha. Padmanabha is also credited with disseminating the philosophy of Dvaita outside the Tulunadu.

Life
According to Narayana Pandita's Madhva Vijaya, Padmanabha, born Shobhanabhatta, a Deshastha Rigvedi Brahmin, was an accomplished scholar and logician. Shobhana Bhatta was native of Puntamba, a town on the bank of the river Godavari  in  Ahmednagar district of Maharashtra. After being won over by Madhva in a debate, he adopted Dvaita and was subsequently tasked by Madhva to disseminate the nascent philosophy across the subcontinent. After his death, he was entombed at Nava Brindavana near Hampi. His disciple Narahari Tirtha succeeded him as the pontiff.

Works
15 extant-works have been ascribed to him, most of which are commentaries on the works of Madhva. His notable works include Nyayaratnavali, a commentary on Madhva's Vishnu Tattva Vinirnaya, Sattarkadipavali a gloss on Bramha Sutra Bhashya and Sannyayaratnavali on Anu Vyakhyana. Sharma notes "dignity, elegance, clearness, brevity and avoidance of digression and controversies mark his style". Though Jayatirtha later diverges from Padmanabha's views, he eulogies the latter's pioneering work in his Nyaya Sudha and acknowledges his influence. Padmanabha's influence is also acknowledged by Vyasatirtha, who attempts, in his Tatparya Chandrika, to reconcile Jayatritha and Padmanabha's views.

See also
 Dvaita Literature

References

Bibliography

External links
 Biography of Padmanabha Tirtha

Medieval Hindu religious leaders
Hindu revivalists
Kannada literature
Madhva religious leaders
People from Bellary district
Dvaitin philosophers
Dvaita Vedanta
Uttaradi Math
Writers from Karnataka
Scholars from Karnataka
14th-century Indian scholars